Long Live the Loud is the third studio album by the Canadian speed metal band Exciter, released through Music for Nations in 1985 and re-released through Megaforce Records in March 2005 with the EP Feel the Knife.

Track listing 
All songs were written by Dan Beehler, except "Victims of Sacrifice" by Allan Johnson and Beehler.

2005 CD edition bonus tracks

Personnel

Exciter 
 Dan Beehler − vocals, drums
 John Ricci − guitar, backing vocals
 Allan Johnson – bass, backing vocals

Production 
Guy Bidmead – producer, engineer
Laura Boisseau – assistant engineer
Alan Craddock – artwork

References 

1985 albums
Exciter (band) albums
Music for Nations albums
Combat Records albums